This is a list of South Alabama Jaguars football players in the NFL Draft.

Key

Selections

References

Lists of National Football League draftees by college football team

South Alabama Jaguars NFL Draft